Zvečan or Zveçan is a town and municipality located in the Mitrovica District in Kosovo. As of 2015, it has a population of 16,650 inhabitants.

Zvečan is a part of North Kosovo, a region with an ethnic Serb majority. According to the 2013 Brussels Agreement, the municipality should become a part of the Community of Serb Municipalities once they are established.

History
The town of Zvečan is located near Mitrovica. It was mentioned for the first time in connection with the border clashes between the Serbs and Byzantines between 1091 and 1094. There is also an inscription that Grand Prince Stefan Nemanja, after the victory over the Byzantines in 1170, ordered that a prayer for the successful outcome of the battle be held in the church of St George at Zvečan.

In the 13th and 14th centuries Zvečan was one of the royal residences of the Serbian court. Queen Theodora died there in December 1322, and nine years later her husband, Stefan Uroš III was imprisoned and strangled there.

First, the Musić, then the Vojinović noble family, held the fortified city and region during the Serbian Empire of Uroš V (r. 1355–1371). As imperial power collapsed Zvečan was in a disputed zone being held by nobleman Miloš Pović in 1370 but claimed by Nikola Altomanović.

In 1389, after the Battle of Kosovo, it was integrated into the Ottoman Empire and later became part of the Sanjak of Novi Pazar.

From 1878 to 1908 it, along with the rest of the Sanjak, was administered by the Austro-Hungarian Empire as a result of the Congress of Berlin. But in 1908 it was returned to Turkey.

On the highest spot, i.e., the Upper Town, there are remains of St George's church, cistern and the main octagonal tower. The ramparts of this part of the fort are reinforced by massive towers. The main entrance to the town was on the western side.

Demographics

According to the 2011 estimations by the Government of Kosovo, Zvečan has 1,838 households and 7,481 inhabitants. In 2015 report by OSCE, the population of Zvečan municipality stands at 16,650 inhabitants.

Ethnic groups
The majority of Zvečan municipality is composed of Kosovo Serbs with around 16,000 inhabitants (95.1%). Also, there are 500 Kosovo Albanians and 300 inhabitants of other ethnicity. About 3,750 Kosovo Serbs are located in the municipality as Internally displaced persons (IDPs) as well as 250 refugees from Croatia. Most of Kosovo Albanians live in the villages of Boletin (Boljetin), Lipë (Lipa) and Zhazhë (Žaža).

The ethnic composition of the municipality of Zvečan, including IDPs:

Economy
The largest employer in Zvečan is the lead and zinc melting factory "Trepča". Its large smokestack is with 306 meters the tallest structure in Kosovo. Due to the serious environmental pollution from the factory, however, UN and KFOR shut it down and the only ongoing operation is alloy production for batteries and battery recycling. Once employing up to 4,000, the very low operations of "Trepča" has had a devastating effect on the local economy. Today, in the municipality only about 500 people are working at 60 small private companies and 150 shops.

Culture and education
The Faculty of Arts, part of the University of Priština at Mitrovica, is situated at Zvečan.

Zvečan has hosted annually two international music festivals: The North City, Jazz & Blues Festival, and international rock festival Overdrive, as well as international art colony Sokolica and children song festival Cvrkuti sa Ibra (Chirrups from the Ibar River).

The Zvečan Fortress and Sokolica Monastery, both from the Middle Ages, have been located in the Zvečan area.

Gallery

See also
 North Kosovo
 Community of Serb Municipalities
 District of Mitrovica

Notes and references
Notes

References

External links

 Official website
 The Faculty of Arts Zvečan

 
Populated places in the District of Mitrovica
North Kosovo
Municipalities of Kosovo
Medieval Serbian sites in Kosovo